Han Soo-ann (18 June 1926 – 4 January 1998) was a South Korean boxer.

Biography
Han graduated from Sungkyunkwan University and served the military as an officer,making one of the first korean boxing teams in the navy.
Han competed for South Korea at the 1948 Summer Olympics held in London, United Kingdom in the flyweight event where he finished in third place. Han also competed for at the 1952 Summer Olympics held in Helsinki, Finland in the flyweight event where he was a quarterfinalist.

1948 Olympic results
Below is the record of Han Soo-An, a South Korean flyweight boxer who competed at the 1948 London Olympics:

 Round of 32: defeated Robert Gausterer (Austria) on points
 Round of 16: defeated Maxim Cochin (France) on points
 Quarterfinal: defeated Appie Corman (Netherlands) by a second-round knockout
 Semifinal: lost to Spartaco Bandinelli (Italy) on points
 Bronze-Medal Bout: defeated Fratisek Majdloch (Czechoslovakia) on points (was awarded bronze medal)

References

External links

1926 births
Olympic boxers of South Korea
Olympic bronze medalists for South Korea
Boxers at the 1948 Summer Olympics
Boxers at the 1952 Summer Olympics
1998 deaths
Olympic medalists in boxing
Sungkyunkwan University alumni
People from Cheonan
South Korean male boxers
Medalists at the 1948 Summer Olympics
Flyweight boxers
Sportspeople from South Chungcheong Province